David William Hughes (born 26 November 1970) is an Australian stand-up comedian, television and radio presenter.

He is known for his larrikin personality, drawling Australian accent, and deadpan comedic delivery.

Hughes co-hosts Hughesy, Ed & Erin with Ed Kavalee & Erin Molan on 2DayFM and is also a guesser on The Masked Singer Australia with Mel B, Chrissie Swan and Abbie Chatfield on Network 10.

Early life
After graduating from the all-boys Christian Brothers' College, Warrnambool in 1988, where he was dux of the school, Hughes briefly studied information technology at Swinburne University in Melbourne, and then accounting at Deakin University in Warrnambool before dropping out to eventually pursue a career in comedy.

Career

Comedy
After leaving university, it was seven years before Hughes found work as a stand-up comedian and he did a variety of jobs including working at an abattoir, as a bricklayer's labourer and a shop assistant.

After dreaming about being a comedian since he was a youngster, his first comedy gig came at age 22 when he was living in Perth doing labouring jobs and he decided, "I'm going to have a crack". Appearing onstage he acknowledges that he was "just horrible" but after three attempts over six months he gained his confidence and went on to become a headline act.

He is a regular performer at the Melbourne International Comedy Festival. Some of his shows have been released on CD (Dave Hughes: Whatever), and on DVD (Dave Hughes, Live, Dave Hughes - Handy and David Hughes - Pointless).

Television
Hughes got his first break on mainstream television when he was asked to do stand-up on Hey Hey Its Saturday, a show Hughes revered growing up. Hughes recalled in a 2021 50-year anniversary Hey Hey special that he hadn't been more nervous before or since that set.

Hughes co-hosted the ABC comedy talk show The Glass House along with Wil Anderson and Corinne Grant. However, it was axed in 2006 amid political controversy.

He has had guest spots on television programs The Fat, Rove Live, The Panel, Thank God You're Here, Talkin' 'Bout Your Generation, The Project, Studio 10, All Star Family Feud, Under Melbourne Tonight, Spicks & Specks, The Living Room, Celebrity Name Game, Would I Lie to You? Australia and Have You Been Paying Attention?.

In the AFL season he is a part of the Network Ten Saturday night show Before The Game alongside Mick Molloy, Lehmo, Andy Maher and Neroli Meadows.

Hughes worked on Australian television show Rove in 2007, with a weekly "Hughesy Loses It" segment. In 2008–09, the segment evolved into a recurring segment known as "Help me Hughesy," where he would rant about a given topic.

On 20 July 2009, Hughes began co-hosting the half-hour Channel 10 show The 7PM Project, which later expanded to become the hour-long The Project.  His regular co-hosts were Charlie Pickering, and Carrie Bickmore. In June 2011, Hughes was one of the few people to be granted a one-on-one interview with the Dalai Lama during his visit to Australia.

In December 2013, Hughes resigned from his full-time position on The Project to return to stand-up comedy. Hughes would, however, appear once a week on the show from wherever he is around the country. Hughes is quoted as saying, "It's definitely a tough decision, as we have had so many unbelievable moments on the desk. You meet some of the biggest stars in the world and chat with them and have some wonderful times". Hughes then stated in 2016 with Mia Freedman on Mamamia his reason for leaving The Project:The news cycle is so set, it's just the same. The news cycle rarely changes. We talk about the same things endlessly and no one's got the answers. Nothing's changed in so long. But to sit there every night and talk about the same things, it's just too much. I'm a comedian, so yeah, that's really why.

Hughes began a year-long round of stand-up engagements around Australia, in Adelaide in February 2014, where he and his family will be based for five weeks before moving onto other venues.

In October 2014, Hughes guest-starred in an episode of ABC-TV's Julia Zemiro's Home Delivery, in which Zemiro accompanied Hughes back to his home-town of Warrnambool to reminisce about his childhood and to explore what influenced him to embark on a career in comedy.

On 28 October 2015, it was confirmed Hughes will be the new host of Australia's Got Talent in 2016.

In October 2017, it was announced that Hughes would be returning to Network Ten to host a new panel show, Hughesy, We Have a Problem.

In 2019, it was announced that Hughes will be one of the guessers on The Masked Singer Australia.

Radio

Nova 100 
In December 2001, Hughes joined comedians Kate Langbroek and Dave O'Neil to co-host a weekday breakfast program Hughesy, Kate & Dave from 6am to 9am on Melbourne's Nova 100. In the past, he has worked for the Triple M network of Australian active rock radio stations. Dave O'Neil later left the station to join Vega 91.5.

KIIS Network 
In November 2014, Australian Radio Network announced the show would relaunch on its KIIS Network of stations in Sydney, Melbourne, Brisbane and Adelaide in the drivetime slot, replacing Rosso on Drive on KIIS 106.5 and Mix 101.1, and local announcers on 97.3 FM and Mix 102.3. The show commenced on 27 January 2015, anchored by former 90.9 Sea FM and 2DayFM announcer Matty Acton. The show was pulled from the KIIS Network on 24 November 2016, a week prior to their final show. Hughes and Langbroek were unable to farewell listeners.

Hit Network 

In September 2017, Southern Cross Austereo announced that Hughes and Kate Langbroek would join the Hit Network in 2018 to replace Hamish and Andy.

In January 2019, Kate Langbroek and her family moved to Bologna, Italy and Langbroek continued to host the show until June. In August 2019, it was announced that Kate will file reports for the show for the remainder of the year. Ed Kavalee filled in as co-host until December.

In December 2019, Kate Langbroek resigned from the show confirming that she will extend her time in Italy. Ed Kavalee has been announced as her replacement from January 2020 and the show was renamed Hughesy & Ed. It was also announced that the show will air from 5pm until 7pm.

In November 2020, Southern Cross Austereo announced that Hughes, Ed Kavalee and Erin Molan would replace Jamie Angel to host The 2Day FM Morning Crew with Hughesy, Ed and Erin Molan from Monday, January 18, 2021. A one-hour highlights package will air nationally at 6pm across the Hit Network.

Advertising
In 2005, Hughes appeared in a series of television commercials for the Australian car manufacturer Holden.

In 2009, Huges appeared in a three embedded advertising zoot review shorts promoting the return of Samboy Chips in which he reveals his favorite flavor is Atomic Tomato and shows off his signature "Conga Line" chip eating technique.

Acting
Early in his career, Hughes had a brief appearance in an episode of Neighbours in 1998.

Hughes has also appeared in Ed Kavalee's comedy films Scumbus, which aired on Ch-10 in 2012 and the yet-to-screen Border Protection Squad.

Discography

Albums

Awards and nominations

ARIA Music Awards
The ARIA Music Awards is an annual awards ceremony that recognises excellence, innovation, and achievement across all genres of Australian music.

! 
|-
| 2003
| Whatever
| Best Comedy Release
| 
| rowspan="3"|
|-
| 2007
| Live
| Best Comedy Release
| 
|-
| 2009
| Dave Hughes Is Handy
| Best Comedy Release
| 
|-

Personal life
He married Holly Ife, a reporter with the Herald Sun, on 31 December 2006. They have three children together.

He gave up drinking alcohol when he was 22 after deciding that it had become a bad influence in his life. Hughes is a vegan.

Hughes is a keen supporter of the Carlton football team in the AFL and even asked the Dalai Lama to bless Carlton: after doing so, the Dalai Lama commented: "It probably won't do much, and it didn't."

Controversy

During the 2007 Logie Awards, which he co-hosted with Adam Hills and Fifi Box, Hughes referred to radio shock-jock Kyle Sandilands as a "massive dickhead" to applause and laughter from the audience. Later that year, when interviewed on Enough Rope with Andrew Denton, Sandilands said of Hughes, "I hate him – the next time I see him I'm going to punch him in the throat." Hughes retorted by releasing an official apology, which said in part that Hughes was "sincerely and deeply sorry that Kyle Sandilands is a massive dickhead" and that "massive dickheads have the same rights as normal people."

References

1970 births
ARIA Award winners
Australian Anglicans
Australian male comedians
Australian stand-up comedians
Comedians from Melbourne
Living people
People from Warrnambool